Banku may refer to,

 Banku (dish)
 Banku (call to prayer)
 Banku, a character in the 2008 Hindi-language film Bhoothnath

See also 
 Bank (disambiguation)
 Vanku (disambiguation)